The Saudi Press Agency (SPA) is the official news agency of Saudi Arabia.

History and profile
The agency was established in 1970 as the first national news agency in Saudi Arabia. The agency is also the first news agency in the Persian Gulf region. The main goal of its establishment was to serve as a central body to collect and distribute local and international news in Saudi Arabia and abroad.

The SPA is under the responsibility of the ministry of Media and therefore, its president directly reports to the
minister. The SAP provides the newspapers with a guideline, the editorial line, which should be followed in their reports. The Agency publishes news in both Arabic and English. The SPA has offices in Bonn, Cairo, London, Tunis and Washington, DC.

In late May 2012, the Saudi Council of Ministers made a decision to separate Saudi Television and Radio and Saudi Press Agency (SPA), making both as two independent corporations.

Under the May 2012 restructuring, the SPA covers events and issues at national, regional and international levels, especially those related to the Kingdom and contribute to strengthening the journalistic profession in the country. The new arrangement also involves the transformation of the SPA into a Presidency. The president is Abdullah bin Fahd Al Hussein. The minister of Media acts as the board chairman of the agency.

In November 2013, the SPA signed a news exchange agreement with Anadolu Agency, official news agency of Turkey.

Activities
The agency organized the fourth News Agencies World Congress (NAWC) in Riyadh in 2013.

See also

 Media in Saudi Arabia
Ministry of Media
 Al Ekhbariya
 Federation of Arab News Agencies (FANA)

References

External links 
 Saudi Press Agency official site (Arabic, English, Persian, Russian, Chinese)
Archive Repository for Selective Saudi Press Agency News Feeds

1970 establishments in Saudi Arabia
Government agencies established in 1970
Mass media in Riyadh
Arab news agencies
Government agencies of Saudi Arabia
Publicly funded broadcasters
State media
News agencies based in Saudi Arabia